Coptotelia perseaphaga is a moth in the family Depressariidae. It was described by Clarke in 1951. It is found in Costa Rica.

References

Moths described in 1951
Coptotelia